Bosham F.C. are a football club based in Bosham, near Chichester, West Sussex, England.

History

Bosham F.C. were formed in 1901 and played in the local football leagues before they joined the Sussex County Football League as founder members of Division Three in 1983. In their second season of the Sussex County Football league the club finished runners-up to Oakwood, winning promotion to Division Two and also winning the Division Three Challenge Cup.

The club remained in Division two for seven seasons when they were relegated back to Division Three at the end of the 1991–92 season. During this period the club made its debut in a national FA competition the FA Vase, when they entered for four seasons in a row from the 1986–87 season, never winning a single game. In the 1993–94 season, the club was promoted back again as champions – albeit a short-live success, as the following two seasons saw successive relegations back to the West Sussex Football League.

Following an overhaul of both players and management, Bosham enjoyed a resurgence on the pitch resulting in one of their most successful seasons ever in 1998–99, winning the coveted ‘treble’ of the West Sussex Football League Premier Division; Malcolm Simmonds Cup and the Centenary Cup – a feat no other club has achieved. This success enabled the club to re-join the Sussex County Football league again in Division Three.

The first season back in the Sussex County league saw Bosham champions of Division three once again, scoring 109 goals along the way – an average of 3.6 per game. The Robins found themselves bottom of Division two again two seasons after promotion and ‘yo-yoed’ back down to Division Three.

The club struggled back at Intermediate level, but a late revival saw them finish one place off the bottom, five points clear of Uckfield Town. Although a relegation position, the resignation of Oving – coupled with only Wadhurst United meeting the requirements for promotion – spared them the drop.

Until the 2006–07 season – a year when Bosham were again reprieved after a picking up the Division Three wooden spoon – there had been signs of improvement, with the club appearing reasonably comfortable in Division Three after many up and down seasons; and in 2004–05, reached the Final of the Sussex Intermediate Cup, where they were defeated by Rustington.

Cup success again afforded the Walton Lane side in 2008–09 when they were beaten by a solitary goal to nil against fellow Division Three side, Forest, in the final of the same trophy.

However Bosham did find the winning formula the following season, drafting in a largely youthful squad alongside one or two more experienced heads, to lead the club to the Division Three title for the third time; the Division Three Challenge Cup, and the Team of the Year award.

Unfortunately, heightened league ground grading regulations were to this time go against Bosham and they were denied a place back in senior football. Despite this knock, the club managed to keep the majority of the team that earned their top spot the previous season, and gallantly went on to finish in fourth place in 2010–11.

In September 2011, Bosham won a £20,000 sponsorship deal with home improvement retailer, Wickes, and featured in national newspaper, The Sun. The prize was a welcome boost for the village club, who had previously struggled for funding and local volunteers. Bosham fought off 300 other non-league clubs to win the competition, with club captain Ben Blanshard writing 250 words as to why they deserved it. The windfall funded a make over for the changing rooms, new kit, training equipment and coaching.

After encouragingly winning six of their opening nine league games of the 2011–12 campaign, a changeable Bosham side saw their season ebb out, as they finished below mid-table. However at the end of that season, the club were demoted back to the West Sussex Football League as their ground did not meet the requirements to carry on playing in the Sussex County League.

Under the guidance of Tony Hancock, the Robins finished in third place in their return season in West Sussex Premier Division, with the title eventually going to Cowfold after being keenly fought out until the last weekend. Despite a positive start to the 2013/14 campaign, Hancock ended his ten-year reign in charge of The Robins, with long-serving player Andy Probee taking over the role in November 2013.

Bosham were soon back on track, with Probee's side winning an impressive 13 of their remaining 16 games to take the West Sussex Premier Division title for a second time, and with it, gain promotion back to Division 3 of the Sussex County League. Sadly, Probee lost his grandad – and Bosham Vice-president – Dennis, a week before the end of the season, so it was perhaps fitting that the club should win the League shortly after. The inaugural Dennis Probee Memorial Cup was set up in his honour, with Bosham facing a 'Sussex XI' side, winning 4–3 on penalties after the sides were tied 2–2 in normal time.

2013/14 was also a great season for the club off the field, with Bosham successfully applying for Sport England funding, enabling the club to modernise their facilities and increase participation with new youth sides planned for 2014/15. The season also saw Bosham gain their FA Charter Standard status.

Bosham made their return to the Sussex County League in 2014/15, finishing their first season back in a creditable fourth spot in Division 3, having featured at the top of the division for much the season, following a blistering start that saw the club win its first six games. Silverware was to follow, as the Robins lifted the Division 3 Cup for a third time, with a 3–0 victory over local rivals, Sidlesham. Football Foundation funding supported the reintroduction of the club's youth section at under 16 level, with a further youth team at under 15 level added in 2015/16. The club were also winners at the Sussex Sports Awards.

In February 2016, Bosham gained a further grant from West Sussex County Council's 'Big Society Fund' in the sum of £10,400 to improve club facilities and infrastructure, and assist with longer-term sustainability and youth participation objectives.

Success on the pitch in 2015/16 again came in the form of the (renamed) SCFL Division 2 Cup – with a 2–1 win over League champions, AFC Varndeanians. The Robins became the first side to retain the trophy since its inception in 1983/84. The season also brought a sixth-place finish in the newly formed Southern Combination League Division 2.

The Robins came back stronger in 2016/17, winning the SCFL Division Two title having led the table for all but the opening two weeks of the season. At the end of the 2016/17 manager Andy Probee stepped down, with former Petersfield Town Director of Football, Gary Lines, appointed to lead the club from 2017/18. The club once again tasted success in the SCFL Division Two Cup in Lines' first season in charge, beating Rustington 1–0 at Pagham, courtesy of a late Matt Andrews goal – for their third League Cup triumph in four seasons.

Although Bosham have never competed in the FA Cup, they were entrants to the FA Vase between 1986 and 1990, however in facing stiff opposition, never managed to win in this competition.

Ground

Bosham play their games at The Recreation Ground, Walton Lane, Bosham, PO18 8QF.

Club honours

League honours
 Southern Combination Football League Division Two
 Winners (1) 2016/17
Sussex County Football League Division Three:
 Winners (3): 1993–94, 1999–00, 2009–10,
 Runners-up (1): 1984–85 
West Sussex Football League Premier Division:
 Winners (2): 1998–99, 2013–14
 West Sussex Football League Division One:
 Winners (1): 1977–78

Cup honours
Southern Combination Football League Division Two Cup:
 Winners (2): 2015–16; 2017–18
Sussex County Football League Division Three Cup:
 Winners (3): 1984–85, 2009–10, 2014–15
 Runners up (1): 1992–93
Sussex Intermediate Cup:
 Runners-up (2): 2004–05, 2008–09
Malcolm Simmonds Memorial Cup:
 Winners (1): 1998–99
West Sussex Football League Centenary Cup:
 Winners (1): 1998–99

Club records

Highest League Position: 7th in Sussex County League Division Two 1985–86, 1994–95
FA Vase best performance: Preliminary Qualifying Round 1987–88, 1988–89

Season-by-season record since 1983
League

 2019-20 all records expunged - season abandoned

F.A. Vase complete record

References

External links
 Official Club Website
 Official site of the Southern Combination Football League
 Musical montage accompanying Bosham's 2009/10 Division 3 Challenge Cup victory

Southern Combination Football League
Football clubs in West Sussex
1901 establishments in England
Association football clubs established in 1901
Football clubs in England
West Sussex Football League